Farishtay is a 1991 Hindi-language film directed by Anil Sharma produced by Mona Shourie Kapoor. It stars Dharmendra, Vinod Khanna,Jaya Prada, Sridevi and Rajinikanth. The film, released on 22 February 1991, was a moderate success.

Plot
Raja Jaichand is dictator of a distant area close to border. He rules with brutality, killing innocent for his personal entertainment. He doesn't accept authority of Indian Government and colludes with foreign forces to keep his power. Gayatri lives with her two adopted brothers, by the names of Veeru and Dheeru, who are small-time crooks, and con men, and are known to the local police. When Gayatri meets and falls in love with Police Inspector Arjun Thanghe, the duo are delighted and arrange her marriage with great pomp and ceremony. 
A flashback sequence reveals that the duo were police trainees. Veeru had fallen in love with their commandant's granddaughter, Sheela. On the day of Holi, Veeru planned to ask her hand in marriage. However, a terrorist kills her along with some family members of other police officers as a revenge for his men. Veeru avenges her death, while Dheeru prevents police force for intervening. They are imprisoned for some time for taking law in their hands.
In present, duo are recruited by Jaichand's henchwoman Lilly, to eliminate and take place of commandos sent by government to run Police camp in their village. There they find that Arjun was previously assigned to run the camp. Arjun attempted to set things right, but is killed in the process, and Gayatri loses her sanity. The duo decides to avenge their sister, but are stopped by their commandant. It is then revealed that despite being thrown out of police force, they had been working undercover for him. He compels them to fight smartly. They take help of local girl, Rasbhari and infiltrate secret fortress of Jaichand. After facing much obstacles, including brutish special soldiers who killed Arjun, they are able to take down Jaichand and his army, avenging Gayatri and restoring her sanity.

Cast 

Dharmendra as Virendra "Veeru" Kumar
Jaya Prada as Sheela, Veeru's love interest (special appearance)
Vinod Khanna as Dhirendra "Dheeru" Kumar 
Sridevi as Rasbhari, Dheeru's love interest
Rajinikanth as Inspector Arjun Tange
Swapna as Gayatri, Veeru and Dheeru's sister and Arjun Tange's wife
Sadashiv Amrapurkar as Raja Jaichand
Amrit Pal as Gulshanchandra, Raja Jaichand's nephew
Kirti Singh as Lily, Raja Jaichand's mistress and secretary 
Kulbhushan Kharbanda as a police commissioner and Sheela's grandfather
Dinesh Hingoo as Sheela's father
Shammi as Mausi
Krishan Dhawan as an uncle 
Rajendra Nath  as Mohan Lal
Brahmachari as Ramu
Javed Khan Amrohi 
Manik Irani as Chhediram
Huma Khan as Angoori, a bar dancer
Bob Christo as Bob, a terrorist
A. K. Hangal as Abdul
Beena Banerjee as a slain child's mother
Syed Badr-ul Hasan Khan Bahadur as a pandit
Guddi Maruti as Pandit's Wife
Raj Kishore as a vegetable seller
Gautam Sarin as a captain under Raja Jaichand
Bhushan Tiwari as Bhushan, Raja Jaichand's henchman
Anand Balraj as Andy
Viju Khote and Johnny Lever as Raja Jaichand Soldiers (guest role in the song "Saat Kunwaron Mein Ek Kunwari")
Tom Alter, Jankidas,  Sudhir and Yunus Parvez play foreign terrorists.

Soundtrack
The songs were composed by Bappi Lahiri.

References

External links
 

1990s Hindi-language films
Films scored by Bappi Lahiri
Films directed by Anil Sharma